Moses Mensah (born 15 August 1998) is a Ghanaian footballer who plays as a left back for the USL Championship club Birmingham Legion.

Career

Early career
Mensah played with Ghana Premier League side WA All Stars, helping the team win the league title in the 2016 season. In 2019, he attended Campbell University in North Carolina to play college soccer. In four seasons with the Fighting Camels, Mensah made 73 appearances, scoring one goal and tallying 13 assists. During his time at Campbell, Mensah was  Big South Freshman Player of the Year and was named to the All-Conference First Team four years in a row. Mensah was also the first Campbell player in the university's 60-year history to be named to the All-South Region teams four times.

While at college, Mensah also appeared in the USL League Two with Des Moines Menace in 2021, where he made nine appearances on the way to winning the USL League Two title. In 2022, he moved to One Knoxville during their inaugural season.

Following college, Mensah entered the 2023 MLS SuperDraft and was selected 74th overall by Real Salt Lake.

Birmingham Legion
On 8 February 2023, Mensah signed with USL Championship side Birmingham Legion.

Honors

Club
Des Moines Menace
USL League Two: 2021

References

External links
 

1998 births
Living people
Association football defenders
Birmingham Legion FC players
Campbell Fighting Camels soccer players
Des Moines Menace players
Expatriate soccer players in the United States
Ghanaian expatriate footballers
Ghanaian expatriate sportspeople in the United States
Ghanaian footballers
Ghana Premier League players
One Knoxville SC players
Real Salt Lake draft picks
USL Championship players
USL League Two players